Daniel McCrohan is a British travel writer and guidebook author who has contributed to more than 30 Lonely Planet guidebooks to countries in Asia. He has also written a number of guides for Trailblazer, including the 2019 edition of the company's seminal guidebook, the Trans-Siberian Handbook.

Early career 
McCrohan trained as a journalist in the UK, and worked as a news reporter for the Surrey Advertiser before becoming the sports editor at the local newspaper group, the Enfield Gazette & Advertiser. He went on to work as a sports reporter for Teletext before moving to China in 2005 to pursue a career in travel writing.

Career in China 
McCrohan lived and worked in China for more than a decade. He has written online articles on China for the BBC, Lonely Planet, CNN, and others, and has been interviewed about travel in China by China Daily and various Chinese television stations. He was also a co-host for nine episodes of the Lonely Planet television series Best in China.

Travel writing 
McCrohan co-wrote multiple editions of Lonely Planet China. and has written or co-written Lonely Planet guides to Beijing, Shanghai, Chengdu and Tibet. He has also contributed to multiple editions of Lonely Planet India, and is the author of the first edition of Lonely Planet's Pocket Delhi & Agra. He has also worked on Lonely Planet guides to Bangladesh, Thailand, Mongolia, Singapore and the Trans-Siberian Railway.

McCrohan has written numerous British walking guides for Trailblazer, and was the subject of a  travel podcast about hiking Hadrian's Wall, a spin-off from the work he did on Trailblazer's guide to the Hadrian's Wall Path 

He has led travel-writing workshops at the Bookworm Literary Festival in Beijing and has been a guest speaker at the  Adventure Travel Show  in London. His work has also appeared in a number of specialist travel publications including Wanderlust Magazine.

References 

Year of birth missing (living people)
Living people
British travel writers
21st-century British male writers
British male journalists
British sports journalists
British expatriates in China
20th-century British male writers
20th-century British journalists